Ainaa Jhyal Ko Putali is a 2022 Nepali coming-of-age film written and directed by Sujit Bidari. The film is Nepal's submission for the 95th Academy Awards for Best International Feature Film. The title of the film is inspired from a poem by Madhav Prasad Ghimire. The film premiered at Busan International Film Festival in 2020. Bidari also won the best director award in 2022 Dhaka International Film Festival.

Synopsis 
Basanta (9 years old) tries to help his sister Bidya (13 years old) by trying to restore her confidence when he notices that she is becoming weak and helpless rather than the strong person with dreams that she used to be.

Cast 

 Kanchan Chimariya as Bidya
 Dinesh Khatri as Basanta
 Siru Bista as Bidya and Basanta's mom
 Ashok Shiwakoti as Bidya and Basanta's dad
 Bisha Chamling Rai as Bidya's mitini
 Umesh Shrestha as Bange
 Raj Thapa as Tule
 Mallika Shrestha as Paarey
 Prasanna Poudel as Gokul

Soundtrack

Reception 
The film received mostly positive reviews from the critics and the audience.

Diwakar Pyakurel from Online Khabar rated the film 4 out of 5 and mentioned "Even if this has apparent flaws and fails commercially, stakeholders of the Nepali film industry, the audience included, need to give it a sincere look and think about the different messages the film imparts – for both content and presentation."

Accolades

References

External links 

 
 Ainaa Jhyal Ko Putali at SBS

Nepalese drama films
2022 films
2020s Nepali-language films
Nepalese coming-of-age films
2020s coming-of-age drama films